Her Husband's Trademark is a 1922 American silent drama film directed by Sam Wood and starring Gloria Swanson and Richard Wayne. Produced by Famous Players-Lasky and distributed by Paramount Pictures, the film was shot on location in El Paso, Texas. Prints of Her Husband's Trademark are held at the George Eastman House and the Gosfilmofond archive in Moscow.

Plot
As described in a film magazine, the Berkeleys are prominent in New York City society, with James (Holmes), a man who bluffs at wealth, using the famed beauty of his new wife Lois (Swanson) to further his business interests in obtaining loans and other favors from capitalists. In the sudden acquired wealth of his old college chum Allan Franklyn (Wayne), who has been absent in Mexico for some years, James sees his big opportunity. The three go to Mexico where the intended catch Allan demonstrates his love for Lois. When she learns that James has been using her solely for his own financial gain, she openly declares her affection for Allan. A bandit (Burton) raids the hacienda and pursues Lois. Her husband is killed while escaping and Allan, the man she loves, carries her across the Rio Grande river to safety and the prospect of happiness.

Cast
 Gloria Swanson as Lois Miller
 Richard Wayne as Allan Franklyn
 Stuart Holmes as James Berkeley
 Lucien Littlefield as Slithy Winters
 Charles Ogle as Father Berkeley
 Edythe Chapman as Mother Berkeley
 Clarence Burton as Mexican bandit
 James Neill as Henry Strom

References

External links

Stills at the Glorious Gloria Swanson website

1922 films
1922 drama films
Silent American drama films
American silent feature films
American black-and-white films
Famous Players-Lasky films
Films directed by Sam Wood
Films shot in El Paso, Texas
Paramount Pictures films
1920s American films